Maryna Arturauna Zuyeva (born 20 March 1992) is a Belarusian speed skater and cyclist, who currently rides for UCI Women's Continental Team . She competed in the women's 3000 metres at the 2018 Winter Olympics.

References

External links
 

1992 births
Living people
Belarusian female speed skaters
Belarusian female cyclists
Olympic speed skaters of Belarus
Speed skaters at the 2018 Winter Olympics
Speed skaters at the 2022 Winter Olympics
Universiade gold medalists for Belarus
Universiade medalists in speed skating
Competitors at the 2017 Winter Universiade
Cyclists from Minsk